The Blackstone Park Conservation District is a public, 45-acre woodland conservation area on the East Side of Providence, Rhode Island. It is run by the non-profit Blackstone Parks Conservancy in partnership with the Providence Parks Department. The park is situated on the west bank of the tidal Seekonk River, within the watershed and wildlife corridor of the Blackstone River Valley. Unlike many city parks, it is actively managed for the purpose of providing habitats for wildlife and supporting a healthy ecosystem for native flora and fauna.

Ecology 
Ecologically, the Blackstone Conservation District is a Northeastern coastal forest. The woodland is dominated by broadleaf trees, predominantly oak, American beech, and black birch. The woods and shoreline are home to many species of shorebirds, gulls, owls and songbirds, as well as various small mammals. The ponds are home to several species of turtle. Along the Seekonk River, there are horse mussels, horseshoe crabs, and occasional harbor seals. Frequently sighted birds include sandpipers, buffleheads, tree swallows, mute swans, ring-billed gulls and American black ducks.

History of the site 

The park is situated in an area where people of the Narragansett Indian tribe lived prior to the arrival of European settlers in the 17th century. In the 1700s, the site was a part of the 300 acre farm owned by the merchant and abolitionist Moses Brown. The area was subdivided by Brown's descendant Moses Jenkins in 1861 as the Blackstone Park Plat. In 1866, Jenkins subdivided his land, donating five acres of land for a public park. Several decades later, in 1893, the city purchased eighteen acres from landowners for park development, with additional land acquired over subsequent decades.

Management and funding 
The Blackstone Parks Conservancy and the City of Providence Parks Department jointly manage both the Blackstone Park Conservation District and the nearby Blackstone Boulevard Park. In addition to public funding and private donations, the Rhode Island Coastal Resources Management Council (CRMC) provided partial funding to the Conservancy in 2020 for coastal upland edge restoration, to mitigate trail erosion.

See also 
Blackstone Boulevard Park
Blackstone Park Historic District
Blackstone Boulevard Realty Plat Historic District

Urban green space
Conservation Biology
Biodiversity
Ecology

References

External links
Blackstone Parks Conservancy
Providence Parks Department

Urban public parks
Conservation areas of the United States
Geography of Providence, Rhode Island